Saurita tijuca is a moth in the subfamily Arctiinae. It was described by Schaus in 1892. It is found in Brazil (Rio de Janeiro).

References

Natural History Museum Lepidoptera generic names catalog

Moths described in 1892
Saurita